The Kidd Kraddick Morning Show (formerly Kidd Kraddick in the Morning) is an American ensemble morning radio show that originates from Dallas, Texas.  The show is heard weekday mornings on flagship station, KHKS, and on dozens of other radio stations around the U.S., airing either a Top 40/CHR, Mainstream Adult Contemporary or Hot Adult Contemporary radio format.

The Kidd Kraddick Morning Show's primary focus is pop culture commentary, with discussions often revolving around the previous night's reality television programming, celebrity relationships and current affairs. The show is broadcast from their studios in Irving, Texas. The show is owned and syndicated by YEA Networks and is distributed by Westwood One. The radio show streams live through Twitch at Kiddtv.com. The Kidd Kraddick Morning Show is available in an on-demand service via the show's website and the iHeartRadio apps.

Some popular segments on the show are "Love Letters to Kellie", "Petty Monday", "Whatever Wednesday", "First World Problems", "Feel Good Friday", "Does that Make Me Crazy?" and "Flush the Format", a Friday morning segment where a featured DJ plays a variety of songs not normally heard.

On September 10, 2012, the show became a part of nationally syndicated Fox television show, Dish Nation, which mainly covers celebrity news as reported on several radio morning shows around the country. On December 16, 2016, the show announced a departure from Dish Nation, with a new TV project in the works. On July 30, 2018, "KiddNation TV", premiered in a limited test run in both Dallas and Houston, Texas. The television show features some of the daily radio show’s content and segments, as well as a look into some of the cast's daily life outside of the studio. KiddNation TV's test run ended on August 24, 2018 after airing a twenty episode season.

From October 1, 1992 until July 26, 2013, the show was hosted by radio DJ and personality, Kidd Kraddick.  But with Kraddick's unexpected death outside of New Orleans on July 27, 2013, the show's future without Kraddick was undetermined. On August 5, 2013, the show resumed live broadcasts as an ensemble program hosted by the remaining co-hosts, with the show continuing to posthumously carry Kraddick's name. On January 15, 2014, the show's name was altered from "Kidd Kraddick in the Morning", to "The Kidd Kraddick Morning Show".

Cast

Current 
 Kellie Rasberry Evans (1994–Present)
 Alaric "Big Al" Mack (1995–Present)
 José "J-Si" Chavez (2006–Present)
 Ana Castillejos (2020-Present)
 Justin "Part-Time Justin" Chavez (2020-Present)

Staff 
 Nick Adams (2009-Present)
 Russ "Russ Face" Francis (2010-Present)
 Lacey Gee (2011-Present)
 Richard "Trey" Peart (2011-Present)
 George "Boss Man" Laughlin (2011-Present)
 Amy Nichols (2013-Present)
 Robert "White Cheddar" Ehrman (January 2008 - March 2014, April 2015 - Present)
 Mike Morse (2014-2015)
 Ana Castillejos (2014-Present)
 Don "The Engineer" Wakefield (2015-Present)
 Justin "Part-Time Justin" Chavez (2015-Present)

Former 
 Kidd Kraddick (October 1992 - July 2013)
 Jocelyn White (1992 - 1994)
 Tom Gribble (1995 - 1999)
 Bert Weiss (1996 - 1998)
 Shanon "Psycho Shanon" Murphy (1999 - 2019)
 Troy Hughes (2000 - 2007)
 Rich Shertenlieb (2000 - 2006)
 Scott Robb (2001 - 2004)
 Taylor Glover (August 2006)
 Maria Todd (October 2006 - November 2006)
 Jenna Owens - as full time co-host (2008 - February 2020)
 Elena Davies (2015 - 2017)
 Cami Henz (2018-2021)

Affiliates
There are currently 50 affiliated stations airing The Kidd Kraddick Morning Show.

KAAK / Great Falls, Montana
KAFX / Lufkin, Texas
KBBQ / Fort Smith, Arkansas
KBIU / Lake Charles, Louisiana
KCDD / Abilene, Texas
KFBZ / Wichita, Kansas
KHDK / Burlington, Iowa
KHKS / Dallas, Texas (flagship station) 
KKMX / Roseburg, Oregon
KKPN / Corpus Christi, Texas
KLJZ / Yuma, Arizona
KMCK / Fayetteville, Arkansas
KMGX / Bend, Oregon
KMMX / Lubbock, Texas
KNIN / Wichita Falls, Texas
KODM / Odessa, Texas
KPWW / Texarkana, Arkansas
KOQL / Columbia, Missouri
KMXJ / Amarillo, Texas
KQVT / Victoria, Texas
KQXT / San Antonio, Texas
KSYN / Joplin, Missouri
KTIB / Thibodaux, Louisiana
KTDR / Del Rio, Texas
KTHC / Sidney, Montana
KTIJ / Hobart, Oklahoma
KTYL / Tyler, Texas
KVKI / Shreveport, Louisiana
KVRW / Lawton, Oklahoma
KWPW / Waco, Texas
KXDR / Pinesdale, Montana
KXFC / Ada, Oklahoma
WAEV / Savannah, Georgia
WCBH / Terre Haute, Indiana
WCDA / Lexington, Kentucky
WDOD / Chattanooga, Tennessee
WEZB / New Orleans, Louisiana
WFMF / Baton Rouge, Louisiana
WHAJ / Bluefield, West Virginia
WHHD / Augusta, Georgia
WQGA / Brunswick, Georgia
WQGN / New London, Connecticut
WREZ / Paducah, Kentucky
WSIM / Florence, South Carolina
WWKZ / Tupelo, Mississippi
WWXM / Myrtle Beach, South Carolina
WVOH / Albany, Georgia 
WYDS / Decatur, Illinois
WYSS / Sault Ste. Marie, Michigan
WZLK / Pikeville, Kentucky

Awards
Kidd Kraddick was awarded radio's Marconi Award as major market radio personality of the year in 2006. Additionally, Kidd Kraddick was also named Best Radio Personality in the Country on national television via the first-ever Radio Music Awards.

In 2007, the show was nominated for the Syndicated Personality/Show of the Year award by Radio & Records magazine. Other finalists included Delilah, Blair Garner, Steve Harvey, The Lia Show, and John Tesh.

In 2015, the radio show received The Kidd Kraddick Award at the TalentMaster's 27th annual Morning Show Boot Camp.

References

External links
KiddNation.com

American talk radio programs
Westwood One